Krasnoborsk is the name of several rural localities in Russia:
Krasnoborsk, Arkhangelsk Oblast, a selo in Krasnoborsky District of Arkhangelsk Oblast
Krasnoborsk, Ulyanovsk Oblast, a selo in Krasnoborsky Rural Okrug of Terengulsky District of Ulyanovsk Oblast